Vîrstele pămîntului is the fifth studio album by Negură Bunget, released on March 31, 2010, on the Code666 label, the same month as the re-recorded Măiestrit album. It was the first album recorded with a new line-up of musicians, after differences broke the original trio apart and the drummer, Negru, continued on with the band's name.

Track listing 
 "Pămînt" – 06:58
 "Dacia hiperboreană" – 08:52
 "Umbra" – 03:31
 "Ochiul inimii" – 08:04
 "Chei de rouă" – 05:51
 "Țara de dincolo de negură" – 05:54
 "Jar" – 04:29
 "Arborele lumii" – 07:37
 "Întoarcerea amurgului" - 08:21
 "Cumpăna" - 06:36 [bonus track on Code666 Records double vinyl only]

Personnel
Corb - vocals, guitars, dulcimer
Negru - drums, percussion
Spin - guitars
Ageru Pământului - vocals, flute, kaval, nai, tulnic, percussion, xylophone
Gădineț - bass guitar, nai
Inia Dinia - keyboards

Additional personnel
Dan Florin Spataru (Encoilmark) – artwork, art direction, design, cover design, photography
Mihai Toma - producer, mixing

External links

Negură Bunget albums
2010 albums